Roland Gardens is a street in South Kensington, London SW7. It runs north to south from Old Brompton Road to Drayton Gardens at its southern end, where it becomes Evelyn Gardens.

History
Building on the street was started in 1870 by Charles Aldin and his sons Charles and William, with more than half completed by 1874, and the rest by 1893.

Notable buildings and residents
Blakes Hotel, is at no. 33, and is considered to be one of the world's first boutique hotels.
The National Laboratory of Psychical Research was once at no. 13.
The artist Collier Twentyman Smithers died in 1943 at no. 36.
Blanche Dugdale, author and Zionist and her husband Edgar Dugdale, a Lloyd's of London underwriter, lived at no. 1.

References

External links 

Brompton, London
1870 establishments in England
Streets in the Royal Borough of Kensington and Chelsea